Zavodoukovsky (masculine), Zavodoukovskaya (feminine), or Zavodoukovskoye (neuter) may refer to:
Zavodoukovsky District, a district of Tyumen Oblast, Russia
Zavodoukovsky Urban Okrug, a municipal formation in Tyumen Oblast